Daviesia cardiophylla is a species of flowering plant in the family Fabaceae and is endemic to the southwest of Western Australia. It is an erect, spreading shrub with heart-shaped, sharply pointed phyllodes and yellow and red flowers.

Description

Taxonomy and naming
Daviesia cardiophylla was first formally described in 1860 by Ferdinand von Mueller in Fragmenta Phytographiae Australiae from specimens collected by Augustus Oldfield. The specific epithet (cardiophylla) means "heart-leaved".

Distribution and habitat
This species of pea grows in woodland in flat or undulating country mainly in the central and southern wheatbelt, in the Avon Wheatbelt, Coolgardie, Geraldton Sandplains, Jarrah Forest and Mallee biogeographic regions of south-western Western Australia.

Conservation status
Daviesia cardiophylla is classified as "not threatened" by the Department of Biodiversity, Conservation and Attractions.

References

cardiophylla
Eudicots of Western Australia
Plants described in 1860
Taxa named by Ferdinand von Mueller